BGF, established in 2011 as the Business Growth Fund, is an investment company that provides growth capital for small and mid-sized businesses in the UK and Ireland.

From a network of 16 offices in the UK and Ireland, the company has invested more than £3 billion in more than 400 small and mid-sized companies. Around three-quarters of its investments have been in companies based outside London and the South East.

BGF typically takes minority, non-controlling shareholdings in investee companies. BGF has completed more than 150 exits by selling businesses in its portfolio.

History 

BGF was founded in 2011 by Barclays, HSBC, Lloyds Bank, Royal Bank of Scotland and Standard Chartered banks, in the wake of the 2008 financial crisis.

The launch followed lobbying of both Conservative and Labour politicians by businessman Sir Nigel Rudd, who had argued for the creation of an organisation to provide equity funding to help close a perceived funding gap for small and mid-sized businesses. A shortfall in funding for small and mid-sized businesses in the UK had been identified as long ago as 1931 by the Macmillan Committee.

BGF was seen as a successor to the Industrial and Commercial Finance Corporation (ICFC), set up by the Bank of England in 1945 and subsequently renamed 3i. BGF has been described as the “modern 3i”.

Stephen Welton, founding CEO, said that a new organisation was needed because 3i’s business model, in line with the private equity industry generally, had evolved to focus on large buyout deals, meaning it had less of a focus on providing growth capital to small and mid-sized businesses.

In 2017, BGF opened an office in Dublin to administer a €250 million fund to invest in small and mid-sized Irish companies. The Irish fund is backed by AIB, Bank of Ireland, Ulster Bank, the Ireland Strategic Investment Fund and BGF’s existing shareholders.

BGF’s model has been replicated in Canada with the Canadian Business Growth Fund, launched in 2018 and backed by financial institutions including Royal Bank of Canada, Toronto-Dominion Bank and Manulife Financial Corp. In 2019, the Australian Business Growth Fund was launched with backing from banks including Commonwealth Bank of Australia, Westpac, National Australia Bank and ANZ Bank.

Leadership 

Andy Gregory has been chief executive officer of BGF since 1 September 2022. He took over from Stephen Welton, formerly of J.P. Morgan Partners, who led BGF since inception in 2011. From 1 January 2023, Welton will serve as non-executive chair of the business.

In 2013, Welton was appointed as an adviser to the government regarding the establishment of the British Business Bank, and, in 2017, he was invited to join the Industry Panel for the UK Government’s Patient Capital Review.

Investment approach 

BGF typically makes initial investments of between £2-15 million, with the possibility for follow-on investments.

The firm provides patient capital, which has been defined by HM Treasury as “long-term investment in innovative firms led by ambitious entrepreneurs who want to build large-scale businesses”.

BGF typically invests as a minority, non-controlling shareholder. Investments are usually structured as ordinary shares, loan notes or a combination.

When an investment is sold, the returns are reinvested in the fund. This model has been called an “evergreen balance sheet”.

BGF invests in a range of companies including start-ups, growth-stage businesses and quoted companies across almost every region and sector of the UK and Irish economy, barring financial services.

BGF has been recognised as the most active growth investor in the world by number of investments, averaging about one investment a week.

Notable investments 

 Recipe box delivery company Gousto first received funding from BGF in 2015. Gousto became a unicorn in 2020 when it completed a funding round valuing the business at more than $1 billion.
 Social video advertising platform Unruly received financing from BGF in a funding round announced in 2012. The business was acquired by News Corp for £58 million in 2015.
 M Squared, which develops lasers and photonic optical instruments, received funding from BGF in 2012. BGF exited the majority of its shareholding in the company in 2020 when the Scottish National Investment Bank became a shareholder.

The growth economy 

The historian Sir Anthony Seldon has described the market segment of small and mid-sized companies in which BGF seeks to invest as “the growth economy”. Research by PwC found there were 21,400 growth economy companies in the UK in 2018, defined as fast-growing businesses that report turnover of between £2.5-100 million.

BGF provides an alternative source of funding for these companies, which have traditionally relied on bank loans to finance growth.

References

External links 
 Official website

British companies established in 2011
Financial services companies established in 2011
Investment in the United Kingdom
Private equity firms of the United Kingdom
Venture capital firms of the United Kingdom